The Parkdale Deanery in the Anglican Diocese of Toronto is a group of seven Anglican Churches in downtown Toronto, Canada.  They include the churches of St. Anne's, Epiphany and St. Mark, Parkdale, St. George by the Grange, St. Mary Magdalene, St. Matthias Bellwoods, St. Stephen-in-the-Fields, and St. Thomas's Anglican Church (Toronto).  After years of slow decline in church attendance, the Deanery has engaged in a process to revise the way churches are managed in this part of the Diocese.

External links
Parkdale Deanery

References

Anglican Church in Ontario